Apogee Electronics is an American manufacturer of audio interfaces and audio converters, USB & iOS microphones as well as audio production software.

History 
Apogee Electronics was founded in December 1985 by Soundcraft USA president Betty Bennett, audio engineer Bruce Jackson, and digital electronics designer Christof Heidelberger. Apogee initially made its name designing anti-aliasing filters that solved many of the early problems associated with digital audio. The company moved to their new headquarter on Berkeley Street in Santa Monica in 2005. Apogee is now a manufacturer of digital audio converters and digital audio interfaces; dithering, limiting and filtering technologies; digital clocking technologies and all-in-one digital recording solutions.

TEC awards 
Apogee Electronics won NAMM Foundation and Technical Excellence & Creativity Awards (TEC Awards) in 2014, 2013, 2012, 2009, 2008, 2007, 2004, 2003, 2002, 2001, 1999, 1998, 1997, 1996, 1994, 1992 and 1988

Apogee studio 
Apogee Studio is a recording studio in Santa Monica located at the headquarter of Apogee Electronics and is owned by Apogee Electronics and producer and mixer Bob Clearmountain, the husband of Apogee's CEO Betty Bennett.
KCRW hosts shows in the venue, called KCRW Apogee Sessions.

Philanthropy and environment 
Apogee Electronics supports non-profit organizations: Corazon de Vida, Care.

Apogee Electronics is a corporate partner of UCLA Institute of Environment and Sustainability.

The company is a Santa Monica certified Green Business and won the Sustainable Quality Award.

Apogee is certified as a Women’s Business Enterprise (WBE) through the Women’s Business Enterprise National Council (WBENC).

Apogee has a certificate of compliance from The WEEE Directive (Waste Electrical and Electronic Equipment). The WEEE Directive addresses the End of Life (EOL) phase of products and contributes to the reduction of wasteful consumption of natural resources.  

A portion of Apogee Electronics’ profits has been distributed among the following charities:

 Amnesty International
 Corazon de Vida
 Plastic Pollution Coalition
 The ONE Campaign
 Save the Children
 Doctors Without Borders
 UNICEF
 CARE
 Conservation International

External links
 Apogee Homepage

References 

Audio equipment manufacturers of the United States
Companies based in Santa Monica, California
Sound cards
Manufacturers of professional audio equipment